Antal Nagy (born 17 October 1956) is a former Hungarian footballer who played as a defender.

References

1956 births
Living people
Association football defenders
Hungarian footballers
Hungary international footballers
1986 FIFA World Cup players
Budapest Honvéd FC players
AS Nancy Lorraine players
Yverdon-Sport FC players
Hungarian expatriate footballers
Expatriate footballers in France
Expatriate footballers in Switzerland
Ligue 1 players
Sportspeople from Szabolcs-Szatmár-Bereg County